Allegro Valley is a steep-sided, glacier-filled valley indenting the east side of Daniels Range just north of White Spur, in the Usarp Mountains, Antarctica. The northern party of the New Zealand Geological Survey Antarctic Expedition, 1963–64, experienced fine weather here after several days of unpleasant travel; therefore, the expedition members named it after John Milton's poem L'Allegro in antithesis to Penseroso Bluff,  to the north. The valley is situated on the Pennell Coast, a portion of Antarctica lying between Cape Williams and Cape Adare.

Its south wall is known as the White Spur.

References
 

Valleys of Victoria Land
Pennell Coast